Keith Griffiths may refer to:

Keith Griffiths (footballer) (born 1927), English former goalkeeper
Keith Griffiths (architect) (born 1954), Chairman of Aedas International and Founder and benefactor of the Griffiths-Roch Foundation
Keith Griffiths (filmmaker), producer of The Piano Tuner of Earthquakes
Keith Griffiths (rugby league), see List of Parramatta Eels players

See also
Keith Griffith (born 1947), current technical director of the US Virgin Islands soccer team
Keith Griffin (disambiguation)
Griffiths (surname)